Bergstrand is a surname. Notable people with the surname include:

Daniel Bergstrand, Swedish record producer
Kristina Bergstrand (born 1963), Swedish ice hockey player
Lorraine Bergstrand, inaugural mayor of Haldimand County, Ontario, Canada
Nanne Bergstrand (born 1956), Swedish footballer and manager
Östen Bergstrand (1873–1948), Swedish astronomer

See also
Bergstrand (crater), a lunar crater